Acalolepta sikkimensis is a species of beetle in the family Cerambycidae. It was described by Stephan von Breuning in 1935.

Subspecies
 Acalolepta sikkimensis nigrina Breuning, 1975
 Acalolepta sikkimensis rufoantennata Breuning, 1975
 Acalolepta sikkimensis sikkimensis (Breuning, 1935)

References

Acalolepta
Beetles described in 1935